Worknesh Degefa (born October 28, 1990) is an Ethiopian long-distance road runner. , she is the fourth-fastest female marathoner in history, based on her 2:17:41 run at the Dubai Marathon, January 25, 2019. The winner of the race in Dubai was Ruth Chepngetich, who holds the third-best marathon time. Degefa had won Dubai in 2017 in 2:22:36. She returned in 2018 to run 2:19:53, finishing fourth behind three other Ethiopians, all of whom achieved rankings in the top 25 of all time.  It was the first time four women had run under 2:20 in the same race. , she is also ranked just outside the top 25 in the half marathon, running 1:06:14 at the Prague Half Marathon in 2016.

On April 15, 2019, Degefa won the Boston Marathon in 2:23:31 in front-running fashion, by surging away from the field only 8 km into the race, despite never having seen the course before, even in training. By the 30 km mark, she had opened up an almost 3 minute lead over the chasers. Edna Kiplagat ran down Heartbreak Hill in an effort to catch Degefa, narrowing the gap to 42 seconds by the finish.

International competitions

References

External links
 

Boston Marathon female winners
Ethiopian female long-distance runners
Ethiopian female marathon runners
Living people
1990 births
African Games medalists in athletics (track and field)
African Games silver medalists for Ethiopia
Athletes (track and field) at the 2015 African Games
20th-century Ethiopian women
21st-century Ethiopian women